Acanthocheila armigera is a species of lace bug in the family Tingidae. It is found in the Caribbean Sea, Central America, North America, and South America.

References

Further reading

 
 

Tingidae
Articles created by Qbugbot
Insects described in 1858